Emilio Herrera Linares (13 February 1879, in Granada, Spain – 13 September 1967, in Geneve, Switzerland) was a Spanish military engineer and physicist.

Biography
He was born in Granada, 1879 and became interested in the military from a young age. His father served in the military as well as attended science fairs and conventions, this would lead to his interest in military science. He graduated from the Academy of Military Engineering of Guadalajara in 1902; he subsequently researched aeronautics, including a brief period at the University of Santander. He is best known for his work in cosmology and pioneering studies for high-altitude flight, spaceflight, computing, and for designing the pressurised stratonautical space suit that was to be used in a planned stratospheric balloon flight in 1936 and that is considered one of the antecedents of the space suit.

During the Spanish Civil War (1936–1939), he remained loyal to the Second Spanish Republic. In 1937, he was made a general. He was a minister in several Spanish Republican government in exile and Prime Minister of the Republic in exile between 1960 and 1962. He was father of the poet José Herrera Petere.

Works

In Fiction
In 2020 he was played by actor Vicente Romero in the Spanish series El ministerio del tiempo.

External links
 Escafandra Estratonautica
  Foundation Emilio Herrera
  Biography of Emilio Herrera 
  Los cien granadinos del siglo XX 
 NASA's Dressing for Altitude, U.S. Aviation Pressure Suits-Wiley Post to Space Shuttle, pages 39-40

References

1879 births
1967 deaths
People from Granada
Spanish military engineers
Spanish engineers
Spanish scientists
Spanish inventors
Spanish generals
Spanish republicans
Spanish military personnel of the Spanish Civil War (Republican faction)
Government ministers of Spain
Exiles of the Spanish Civil War in Switzerland
Recipients of the Order of Isabella the Catholic
Commanders of the Order of Isabella the Catholic